My Main Man is an album by saxophonist Sonny Stitt featuring trombonist Bennie Green recorded in Chicago in 1964 and released on the Argo label.

Reception

Allmusic awarded the album 4½ stars.

Track listing 
All compositions by Sonny Stitt and Bennie Green except as indicated
 "Flame and Frost" (Esmond Edwards) - 4:31     
 "Let's Play Chess" (Sonny Stitt) - 4:50     
 "Double Dip" - 4:41     
 "Our Day Will Come" (Bob Hilliard, Mort Garson) - 5:17     
 "My Main Man" - 5:54     
 "The Night Has a Thousand Eyes" (Buddy Bernier, Jerry Brainin) - 5:14     
 "Broilin'" - 4:27

Personnel 
Sonny Stitt - alto saxophone, tenor saxophone
Bennie Green - trombone
Bobby Buster - organ
Joe Diorio - guitar
Dorel Anderson - drums

References 

1964 albums
Argo Records albums
Sonny Stitt albums
Albums produced by Esmond Edwards